XHMVS-FM is a radio station in Mexico City. Broadcasting on 102.5 FM from a tower on Cerro del Chiquihuite, XHMVS-FM is owned by MVS Comunicaciones and is a news-talk station under the name MVS Noticias.

History
In 1964, a concession was awarded to Ruben Marin y Kall for a new radio station on 102.5 FM in Mexico City, under the callsign XHV-FM. The station took to the air in 1967, and the next year it was sold to Joaquín Vargas Gómez, founder of MVS, who increased its power from 1 to 54 kW. During this time, the station was an English-language music outlet under the name Stereorey, a name still evident in the name of the concessionaire for almost all of MVS's owned-and-operated radio stations in Mexico. The Stereorey format was available nationwide on a network of stations mostly owned by MVS.

On October 8, 1991, this station, the flagship of the Stereorey network, was renamed XHMVS-FM and its power increased to 80 kW, but the station's first format change since the 1960s would not come until 2002. At that time, Stereorey gave way nationwide to Best FM, with a newer music mix. In March 2004, this was replaced with the station's first news-based format, MVS 102.5. This station broadcast the newscasts of Grupo Monitor, as Monitor, newly broken off from Radio Centro, and MVS had a partnership at the time. After a two-year stint from 2006 to 2008, in which it took on the national MVS "La Mejor" grupera format, XHMVS-FM returned to a news format.

In 2015, the Stereorey format was relaunched as an online, commercial-free stream.

Format
MVS Noticias includes a wide range of news and talk programs, as well as contemporary music in English during off-hours, a remnant of its previous Stereorey/Best FM formats.

References

Radio stations established in 1967
Radio stations in Mexico City
News and talk radio stations in Mexico